The 2021 ICC Men's T20 World Cup Europe Qualifier was a cricket tournament that was played as part of qualification process for the 2022 ICC Men's T20 World Cup. The sub regional tournaments were scheduled to take place in June and July 2021 in Finland and Belgium, with the regional final taking place in October 2021 in Spain. In April 2018, the International Cricket Council (ICC) granted full international status to Twenty20 men's matches played between member sides from 1 January 2019 onwards. Therefore, all the matches in the Regional Qualifiers were played as Twenty20 Internationals (T20Is).

However, in May 2021, after several postponements due to the COVID-19 pandemic, the sub-regional qualifiers were cancelled. As a result of the sub-regional qualifiers being cancelled, Italy, Germany and Denmark qualified from Groups A, B and C respectively, based on their positions in the ICC Men's T20I Team Rankings as of 30 April 2020. Jersey won the Regional Final, with Germany finishing in second place on net run rate, with both teams advancing to the Global Qualifiers.

Background
The top team in each sub regional qualifier would have progressed to the Regional Final, with the top two teams from the final progressing to one of the two Global Qualifiers. Jersey, the highest ranked team as of 1 January 2020, progressed directly to the Regional Final. On 28 January 2020, the ICC confirmed the teams and locations of the participants in the Europe Qualifier, with Finland hosting its first ever ICC event.

Originally the qualifiers were scheduled to be played between May and November 2020, in Belgium, Finland and Spain. However, on 24 March 2020, the International Cricket Council (ICC) confirmed that all ICC qualifying events scheduled to take place before 30 June 2020 had been postponed due to the COVID-19 pandemic. The European groups were originally scheduled to take place at the La Manga Club in Spain in late August 2020, with the Regional Final also taking place at La Manga, possibly as late as November 2020. However, due to the impact of the pandemic, the qualifiers were planned to take place in 2021, with two events in Finland and one in Belgium.

Teams
The teams were placed into the following groups:

Qualifier A

Qualifier A was originally scheduled to take place from 16 to 22 May 2020 at the La Manga Club in Spain. The event was rescheduled to take place at the end of August 2020, but was later postponed again. In December 2020, ICC announced that the 8 team tournament would have been played between 8 and 13 July 2021. Finland were named as the hosts of this tournament. The group stage would have seen Bulgaria, Cyprus, France and Israel in one group, with Italy, Malta, Norway and Spain in the other.

Qualifier B

Group B was originally scheduled to take place from 24 to 30 June 2020 at the Kerava National Cricket Ground in Kerava and Tikkurila Cricket Ground and in Vantaa in Finland. The event was rescheduled to take place at the end of August 2020, but was later postponed again. In December 2020, ICC announced that the 8 team tournament would have been played between 30 June and 5 July 2021, with Finland hosting the event.

Qualifier C

Qualifier C was originally scheduled to take place from 10 to 16 June 2020 in Belgium at the Royal Brussels Cricket Club in Waterloo and the Belgian Oval in Ghent. The event was rescheduled to take place at the end of August 2020, but was later postponed again.  The event was rescheduled to take place at the end of August 2020, but was later postponed again. In December 2020, ICC announced that the 8 team tournament would have been played between 5 and 10 July 2021. Belgium would have hosted the tournament. The group stage would have seen Czech Republic, Denmark, Isle of Man and Romania in one group, with Austria, Belgium, Portugal and Serbia in the other.

Regional Final

In December 2020, the ICC announced that the four-team tournament would be played in Spain between 15 and 21 October 2021, with two teams moving on to the next round. The schedule was announced in early October.

At the halfway stage, Jersey were on top of the table after winning their opening three games. Jersey then won their next match to confirm their progression to the Global Qualifiers. Germany finished in second place, ahead of Italy on net run rate, to also advance to the Global Qualifiers.

Squads

On 20 September 2021, Italy named former England international bowler Jade Dernbach in their squad, as well as Australian-born Kent bowler Grant Stewart, both of whom qualify via their Italian mothers. Gareth Berg of Northamptonshire was named as captain and coach, with former England international Owais Shah as assistant coach. Germany were boosted by a return to the national squad for Leicestershire bowler Dieter Klein, and a return from retirement for former Somerset and Glamorgan all-rounder Craig Meschede. Fayaz Khan and Faisal Mubashir were added to the German squad as reserves in October 2021. A dispute between the Danish association and its players following a proposed change to the selected squad, resulted in a number of players making themselves unavailable for selection. The Danish squad included former England international bowler Amjad Khan.

Points table

 advanced to the global qualifier

Fixtures

References

External links
 Series home at ESPN Cricinfo

Associate international cricket competitions in 2021
Associate international cricket competitions in 2021–22
Qualifiers
ICC Men's T20 World Cup Europe Qualifier
ICC